This is a list of variants of the Harrier jump jet family of V/STOL ground attack fighter aircraft.

Hawker Siddeley P.1127

P.1127
Experimental V/STOL fighter, two prototypes and four development aircraft.

Kestrel FGA.1
Aircraft for the tripartite evaluation squadron, nine built, six later transferred to the United States where they were designated XV-6A.

P.1127 (RAF)
Development V/STOL ground attack and reconnaissance fighter, six built as pre-production evaluation aircraft before the type was ordered into production as the Harrier GR1.

XV-6A
United States military designation for the six Kestrel FGA.1 transferred to the United States.

VZ-12
United States Army designation for two P.1127 development aircraft, not delivered.

Hawker Siddeley Harrier

Single-seat
Harrier GR.1
 Initial production version for RAF, powered by 19,000 lbf (84.7 kN) Rolls-Royce Pegasus 6 (Pegasus Mk 101 in RAF service). A total of 61 built.

Harrier GR.1A
 Upgraded version of the GR.1, the main difference being the uprated (20,500 lbf (91.4 kN)) Pegasus 10 (or Pegasus Mk 102) engine. 17 GR.1As new-built and a further 41 GR.1s upgraded to GR.1A configuration, for a total of 58 GR.1As.

Harrier GR.3
 Featured its sensors (such as a laser tracker in the lengthened nose and radar warning receiver on the fin and tail boom) and a further uprated (21,500 lbf (95.9 kN)) Pegasus 11 (Pegasus Mk 103). A total of 40 new built, with last delivered in December 1986, and about 62 converted from GR.1/GR.1As.

AV-8A Harrier
 Single-seat ground-attack, close air support, reconnaissance, and fighter aircraft, powered by Pegasus 11 (designated F102-RR-402 by US) with simplified nav/attack system. 102 ordered for the USMC. Company designation Harrier Mk 50.

AV-8C Upgraded AV-8A for the USMC.

AV-8S Matador
 Export version of the AV-8A Harrier for the Spanish Navy, later sold to the Royal Thai Navy. Spanish Navy designation VA-1 Matador. Company designation Harrier Mk 53 for the first production batch, and Mk 55 for the second batch.

Two-seat

Harrier T.2
 Lengthened two-seat training version for the RAF, powered by Pegasus Mk 101 engine and with taller fin.

Harrier T.2A
 Upgraded T.2, powered by a Pegasus Mk 102.

Harrier T.4
 Two-seat training version for the Royal Air Force, equivalent to the GR.3, with Pegasus Mk 103 engine, laser seeker and radar warning receiver. Reverted to short fin of single seater.

Harrier T.4A
  T.4 without laser seeker .

Harrier T.4N
 Two-seat training version of the T.4A for the Royal Navy, with avionics (excluding radar) based on Sea Harrier FRS.1.

Harrier T.4(I)
 Conversion of ex-RAF T.4 airframes by BAE Systems, for the Indian Navy. Attrition replacements for India's Harrier T.60. Delivered from May 2003.

Harrier T.8
 Naval trainer modified from early trainer variants and fitted with Sea Harrier F(A).2 avionics.

Harrier T.52
 Two-seat company demonstrator of an export variant of the T.2, originally Pegasus 102 powered but uprated to Pegasus 103 following an accident in 1971, one built first flown 15 September 1971. Registered G-VTOL

Harrier T.60
 Export version of the T4N two-seat training version for the Indian Navy.

TAV-8A Harrier
 Two-seater training version for the USMC, powered by a Pegasus Mk 103. Company designation Harrier Mk 54. Eight built.

TAV-8S Matador
 Export version of the TAV-8A Harrier for the Spanish Navy. Later sold to the Royal Thai Navy. Spanish Navy designation VAE-1 Matador. Company designation Harrier Mk 54.

British Aerospace Sea Harrier

Sea Harrier FRS.1
 57 FRS1s were delivered between 1978 and 1988; most survivors converted to Sea Harrier FA2 specifications from 1988.

Sea Harrier FRS.51
 Single-seat fighter, reconnaissance and attack aircraft made for the Indian Navy, similar to the British FRS1.  Unlike the FRS1 Sea Harrier, it is fitted with Matra R550 Magic air-to-air missiles. These aircraft were later upgraded with the Elta EL/M-2032 radar and the Rafael Derby BVRAAM missiles.

Sea Harrier F(A).2
 Upgrade of FRS1 fleet in 1988, featuring the Blue Vixen Pulse-Doppler radar and the AIM-120 AMRAAM missile.

McDonnell Douglas AV-8B Harrier II

YAV-8B Two prototypes converted in 1978 from existing AV-8A airframes (BuNo 158394, 158395).

AV-8B Harrier II
 "Day Attack" variant. Most were upgraded to one of the following two variants, while the remainder were withdrawn from service. 4 full scale development (FSD) aircraft were built in 1982, followed by 162 production aircraft, built 1983–1989.

AV-8B Harrier II Night Attack
 Incorporates a Navigation Forward Looking Infrared camera (NAVFLIR). Upgraded cockpit, compatible with night vision goggles. More powerful Rolls-Royce Pegasus 11 engine. Originally designated AV-8D.

AV-8B Harrier II+
 Similar to the Night Attack variant, with the addition of an APG-65 radar. It is used by the USMC, Spanish Navy, and Italian Navy. 72 were converted from existing AV-8B, 43 were newly built from 1993 to 1997.

TAV-8B Harrier II
 Two-seat trainer version. 23 were built between 1986 and 1992.

TAV-8B Harrier II+
 Two two-seat trainer aircraft built for Italy 1990 to 1991.

EAV-8B Matador II
 Company designation for the Spanish Navy version. 12 were built 1987 to 1988.

EAV-8B Matador II+
 AV-8B Harrier II+ for Spanish Navy, 11 were converted from EAV-8B, 8 were new built 1995 to 1997.

British Aerospace Harrier II
GR5
The GR5 was the RAF's first second-generation Harrier. The GR5 differed from the USMC AV-8B in avionics fit, weapons and countermeasures. Forty one GR5s were built.

GR5A
The GR5A was a minor variant of the Harrier which incorporated changes in the design in anticipation of the GR7 upgrade.

GR7
The GR7 was an upgraded version of the Harrier GR5.

GR7A
The GR7A is a GR7 with an uprated Rolls-Royce Pegasus 107 engine. The Mk 107 engine provides around 3,000 lbf (13 kN) extra thrust than the Mk 105's 21,750 lbf (98 kN) thrust, increasing aircraft performance during "hot and high" and carrier-borne operations.

GR9
The Harrier GR9 is an avionics and weapons upgrade of the standard GR7.

GR9A
The Harrier GR9A is an avionics and weapons upgrade of the uprated engined GR7As. All GR9s are capable of accepting the Mk 107 Pegasus engine to become GR9As.

T10
The Harrier T10 is the original two seat training variant of the second-generation RAF Harrier. The RAF used the USMC trainer, the TAV-8B, as the basis for the design.

T12
The RAF needed trainers to reflect the upgrade of the GR7 to GR9. Nine T10 aircraft were to receive the JUMP updates under the designation T12, but retain the less powerful Pegasus 105 engine.

See also

References
Notes

Citations

Bibliography

Bishop, Chris and Chris Chant. Aircraft Carriers. Grand Rapids, Michigan, USA: Zenith Imprint, 2004. .
Braybrook, Roy. Battle for the Falklands: Air Forces. Oxford, UK: Osprey Publishing, 1982. .
Brown, Kevin. "The Plane That Makes Airfields Obsolete." Popular Mechanics, 133(6), June 1970, pp. 80–83.
Bull, Stephen. Encyclopedia of Military Rechnology and Innovation. Westport, Connecticut, USA: Greenwood Publishing, 2004. .
Burr, Lawrence and Peter Bull. US Fast Battleships 1938–91: The Iowa Class. New York, USA: Osprey Publishing, 2010. .
Buttler, Tony. British Secret Projects: Jet Fighters Since 1950. Hinckley, UK: Midland Publishing, 2000. .
Congress Committee on Appropriations. "Department of Defense Appropriations for 1979: Part 5". Washington D.C., USA: U.S. Government Printing Office, 1979.
Cowan, Charles W. (ed.) Flypast 2. Windsor, Berkshire, UK: Profile Publications Ltd., 1972. .
Davies, Peter and Anthony M. Thornborough. The Harrier Story.  Annapolis, Maryland, USA: Naval Institute Press, 1997. .
Ellis, Ken. Wrecks & Relics, 21st edition. Manchester, UK: Crécy Publishing, 2008. .
Evans, Andy. BAe/McDonald Douglas Harrier. Ramsbury, UK: The Crowood Press, 1998. .
Farley, John. A View from the Hover: My Life in Aviation. Bath, UK: Seager Publishing, 2008. .
Freedman, Lawrence. The Official History of the Falklands Campaign. Volume II: War and Diplomacy. London, UK: Routledge, 2007. .
Friedman, Norman. U.S. Aircraft Carriers: an Illustrated Design History. Annapolis, Maryland, USA: Naval Institute Press, 1983. .
Gunston, W. T. "Pegasus updating prospects". Flight International, 22 January 1977, pp. 189–191.
Hannah, Donald. Hawker FlyPast Reference Library. Stamford, Lincolnshire, UK: Key Publishing Ltd., 1982. .
Jackson, Paul. "British Aerospace/McDonnell Douglas Harrier". World Air Power Journal, Volume 6, Summer 1991. pp. 46–105.
James, Derek N. Hawker, an Aircraft Album No. 5. New York: Arco Publishing Company, 1973. . (First published in the UK by Ian Allan in 1972)
Jefford, C.G., ed. The RAF Harrier Story. London: Royal Air Force Historical Society, 2006. .
Jenkins, Dennis R. Boeing / BAe Harrier. North Branch, Minnesota: Specialty Press, 1998. .
Layman, R D and Stephen McLaughlin. The Hybrid Warship. London: Conway, 1991. .
Markman, Steve and Bill Holder. Straight Up: A History of Vertical Flight. Atglen, PA: Schiffer Publishing, 2000. .
Mason, Francis K. Harrier. Wellingborough, UK: Patrick Stephens Limited, Third edition, 1986. .
Mason, Francis K. Hawker Aircraft since 1920. London: Putnam, 1991. 
Mason, Francis K. Hawker Aircraft since 1920. London: Putnam Publishing, 1971. .
Miller, David M. O. and Chris Miller. "Modern Naval Combat". Crescent Books, 1986. .
Moxton, Julian. "Supersonic Harrier: One Step Closer". Flight International, 4 December 1982, pp. 1633–1635.
Spick, Mike and Bill Gunston. The Great Book of Modern Warplanes. Osceola, WI: MBI Publishing, 2000. .
Sturtivant, Ray. Fleet Air Arm Fixed-Wing Aircraft since 1946.  Tonbridge, Kent, UK: Air-Britain (Historians), 2004. .
Sturtivant, Ray. RAF Flying Training and Support Units since 1912. Tonbridge, Kent, UK: Air-Britain (Historians), 2007. .
Swanborough, Gordon and Peter M. Bowers. United States Navy Aircraft since 1911. Putnam Aeronautical, 1990. .
Vann, Frank. Harrier Jump Jet. New York, USA: Bdd Promotional Book Co, 1990. .

Further reading
 Farley, John  OBE. A View From The Hover: My Life In Aviation. Bath, UK: Seager Publishing/Flyer Books, 2010, first edition 2008. .
 Polmar, Norman and Dana Bell. One Hundred Years of World Military Aircraft. Annapolis, Maryland, USA: Naval Institute Press, 2003. .

External links

 History – The Origins of the P.1127, at Harrier.org.uk
 The P.1127 Analysed – a 1962 Flight International article on the Hawker P.1127
 P.1127 Development – a 1963 Flight International article on the development of the Hawker P.1127
 British Aerospace Sea Harrier
 Sea Harrier Still Alive and Kicking (archive article)
 Harrier history website
 Harriers lost in the Falklands
  Up-to-date resource of all UK Harriers and Designations
 Harrier development & service, 4 part series
 Photographs of Harrier G R Mk 7 deployed aboard HMS Illustrious
 RTP-TV AeroSpace Show: Video of Harrier Hovering
 AV-8B Plus product page at Boeing.com
 AV-8B Harrier II fact sheet and AV-8B Harrier II history page at Navy.mil
 AV-8B Harrier page at Globalsecurity.org
 McDonnell Douglas/British Aerospace AV-8B Harrier II Attack Fighter page on Aerospaceweb.org
 RTP-TV AeroSpace Show: Video of Harrier Hovering
 3D view of Harrier AV-8B at the National Museum of the Marines Corps site
 Greg Goebel Harriers
Photos of this aircraft on Airliners.net
Photographs of Harrier G R Mk 7 deployed aboard HMS Illustrious
Defense Industry Daily: AV-8B Harrier finding Success in Iraq (30 March 2005)
 Harrier history website
 Harrier page on globalsecurity.org
 Harriers lost in the Falklands

1960s British experimental aircraft
1970s British attack aircraft
1970s British fighter aircraft
1960s British fighter aircraft
1980s British attack aircraft
1980s British fighter aircraft
1980s United States attack aircraft
V-08AB Harrier II
Variants